Nationality words link to articles with information on the nation's poetry or literature (for instance, Irish or France).

Events
 Samuel Minturn Peck becomes first Poet Laureate of Alabama, a title created for him.

Works published

Canada
 Alfred Bailey, Tao: A Ryerson Poetry Chap Book, (Ryerson).
 Wilson MacDonald, Caw-Caw Ballads Montclair, NJ: Pine Tree Publishing.
E. J. Pratt:
 The Roosevelt and the Antinoe, Toronto: Macmillan.
Verses of the Sea, Toronto: Macmillan. intr. by Charles G.D. Roberts.
 W. W. E. Ross, Laconics.

United Kingdom
 Richard Aldington, editor, Imagist Anthology
 An Anthology of War Poems, compiled by Frederick Brereton
 W. H. Auden, Poems, his first published book (accepted by T. S. Eliot on behalf of Faber & Faber, which remains Auden's publisher for the rest of his life)
 Samuel Beckett, Whoroscope, his first separately published work; Irish poet published in France
 Julian Bell, Winter Movement
 Hilaire Belloc, New Canterbury Tales, illustrated by Nicholas Bentley
 Edmund Blunden, The Poems of Edmund Blunden
 Basil Bunting, Redimiculum Matellarum, his first book of poems, published in Milan
 Roy Campbell, South African native published in the United Kingdom:
 Adamastor
 Poems
 Catherine Carswell, The Life of Robert Burns, biography
 Elizabeth Daryush, Verses
 T. S. Eliot:
 Ash Wednesday
 Marina
 Translator (and writer of the introduction), Anabasis, translation from the original French of Saint-John Perse's Anabase 1924; London: Faber
 William Empson, Seven Types of Ambiguity, a book of criticism
 Stella Gibbons, The Mountain Beast, and Other Poems
 Gerard Manley Hopkins, Poems of Gerard Manley Hopkins, edited by Charles Williams (see also Poems 1918)
 D. H. Lawrence (both posthumous):
 Nettles
 The Triumph of the Machine
 Hugh MacDiarmid, pen name of Christopher Murray Grieve, To Circumjack Cencrastus; or, The Curly Snake, written and published in English and Scots
 'Æ', pen name of George William Russell, Enchantment, and Other Poems
 Edith Sitwell, Collected Poems
 Stephen Spender, Twenty Poems
 Katharine Tynan, Collected Poems
 Humbert Wolfe, The Uncelestial City
 D. B. Wyndham-Lewis and Charles Lee, compilers, The Stuffed Owl: an anthology of bad verse

United States
 W. H. Auden, Poems
 Hart Crane, The Bridge
 Babette Deutsch, Fire for the Night
 Richard Eberhart, A Bravery of Earth
 Robert Frost, Collected Poems
 Horace Gregory, Chelsea Rooming House
 Stanley J. Kunitz, Intellectual Things
 William Ellery Leonard, This Midland City
 Archibald MacLeish, New Found Land
 Edgar Lee Masters, Leechee Nuts
 Ezra Pound, A Draft of XXX Cantos, American poet writing in Europe
 Lizette Woodworth Reese, White April
 Edward Arlington Robinson, The Glory of the Nightingales
 Allen Tate, Three Poems
 Sara Teasdale, Stars To-night
 Yvor Winters, The Proof

Other in English
 Samuel Beckett, Whoroscope, Irish writer published in the United Kingdom
 Una Marson, Tropic Reveries, the first "noted" collection of poems by a West Indian woman
 Brian O'Nolan, "Ad Astra", in Blackrock College Annual, Irish writer (his first published work)
 Quentin Pope, editor, Kowhai Gold, anthology of New Zealand poetry (published in London & New York)

Works published in other languages

France
 René Char, Ralentir travaux
 Paul Claudel, Le Soulier de satin, France
 Michel Deguy, French academic, essayist, translator and poet
 Robert Desnos, Corps et biens: poemes 1919–1929
 Léon-Paul Fargue, Sous la lampe
 Henri Michaux, Un Certain Plume ("A Person Called Plume"), in which the character Plume, a symbolic, alienated underdog, first appears
 Pierre Reverdy, Pierres blanches
 Jules Supervielle, Le Forçat innocent

Indian subcontinent
Including all of the British colonies that later became India, Pakistan, Bangladesh, Sri Lanka and Nepal. Listed alphabetically by first name, regardless of surname:
 Ananta Pattanayak, Raktasikha, Oriya-language
 Dimbeshwar Neog, Indradhanu, Assamese-language
 Kazi Nazrul Islam, translator, Rubaiyat-i-Haphij, translated from the Persian quatrains of the poet Shiraji Hafiz into Bengali
 Laxmi Prasad Devkota, Muna Madan, मुनामदन, Nepali
 Maraimalai Atikal, Manikkavacakar Varalarum Kalamum, a two-volume study of Manikkavacakar, a saint-poet of the Saivaite sect, in Tamil; criticism
 Mathuranatha Shastri, adaptor, Sahitya-Vaibhava, various Hindi poems translated into Sanskrit and adapted
 T. P. Meenakshisundaram, Valluvarum Makalirum, on the concept of womanhood in the works of ancient Tamil poets; scholarship
 Yatindranath Sengupta, Marumaya, Bengali

Spanish language
 Enrique Bustamante y Ballivián, Junin, Peru
 León de Greiff, Libro de signos, precedido de Los pingüinos peripatéticos; seguido de Fantasías de nubes al viento (Segundo Mamotreto), Columbia
 Federico García Lorca, Poeta en Nueva York written this year, published posthumously in 1940, first translation into English as "A Poet in New York", 1988)
 León Felipe, Veersos y oraciones del caminante ("Verses and Prayers of the Walker"), second volume (first volume, 1920); Spain
 Luis Fabio Xammar, Pensativamente, Peru

Other
 Gonzalve Desaulniers, Les bois qui chantent; French language;, Canada
 Jens August Schade, Hjertebogen ("The Heart Book"), Denmark
 J. Slauerhoff, Serenade, Dutch

Awards and honors
John Masefield becomes Poet Laureate of the UK.
 Pulitzer Prize for Poetry: Conrad Aiken: Selected Poems
 Frost Medal: Jessie Rittenhouse and (posthumously) to Bliss Carman, and George Edward Woodberry

Births
Death years link to the corresponding "[year] in poetry" article:
 January 1
 Adunis or "Adonis" (Ali Ahmad Said Esber), Syrian-born  Arabic poet and essayist who makes his career largely in Lebanon and France
 Jean-Pierre Duprey (died 1959), French poet and sculptor
 January 5 – Jesús Rosas Marcano (died 2001), Venezuelan poet
 January 23 – Derek Walcott (died 2017), Caribbean St. Lucian-born English-language poet, playwright, writer and visual artist
 February 15 – Bruce Dawe (died 2020), Australian poet
 March – Alvin Aubert (died 2014), African-American poet and scholar
 March 21 – Roger-Arnould Rivière (suicide 1959), French poet
 March 26 – Gregory Corso (died 2001), American poet
 April 8 – Miller Williams (died 2015), American poet, translator and editor
 May 3 – Juan Gelman (died 2014), Argentine poet
 May 8 – Gary Snyder, American poet, essayist, lecturer and environmental activist
 May 11 – Kamau Brathwaite (died 2020), Caribbean native of Barbados, writer, poet, dramatist and academic
 May 12 – Mazisi Kunene (died 2006), South African poet
 May 23 – Friedrich Achleitner (died 2019), Austrian architect and poet
 June 9 – Roberto Fernández Retamar (died 2019), Cuban poet and literary critic
 June 11 – Roy Fisher (died 2017), English poet and jazz pianist
 June 23 – Anthony Thwaite (died 2021), English poet, writer and editor, married to the writer Ann Thwaite
 August 17 – Ted Hughes (died 1998), English poet and children's writer, Poet Laureate of the United Kingdom from 1984
 September 25 – Shel Silverstein (died 1999), American writer of children's verse
 October 10 – Harold Pinter (died 2008), English playwright, poet, actor, theatre director, screenwriter, human rights activist, winner of the 2005 Nobel Prize in Literature
 October 24 – Elaine Feinstein (died 2019), English poet, novelist, short-story writer, playwright, biographer and translator
 November 16 – Chinua Achebe (died 2013), Nigerian writer and poet
 November 19 – Bernard Noel (died 2021), French poet and writer
 November 20 – Bai Hua (died 2019), Chinese poet, dramatist and novelist
 December 2 – Jon Silkin (died 1997), English poet
 December 27 – Attoor Ravi Varma (died 2019), Indian Malayalam poet and translator
 Also:
 Tony Connor, English poet and playwright
 Adolph Endler, German

Deaths
Birth years link to the corresponding "[year] in poetry" article:
 March 2 – D. H. Lawrence (born 1885), English author, poet, playwright, essayist and literary critic, from tuberculosis
 April 10 – Alfred Williams (born 1877), English "hammerman poet"
 April 14 – Vladimir Mayakovsky (born 1893), Russian poet, committed suicide
 April 21 – Robert Bridges (born 1844), English Poet Laureate
 April 29 – Maria Polydouri (born 1902), Greek poet, from tuberculosis

See also

Poetry
 List of poetry awards
 List of years in poetry
 New Objectivity in German literature and art
 Oberiu movement in Russian art and poetry

Notes

20th-century poetry
Poetry